Edward Seeman (pseudonym Eduardo Cemano) is an American artist whose works have spanned disparate fields, from award-winning animated television commercials for children to films of artistic nudity and hardcore pornography. He is also known for his cinemaphotography and for his work with Frank Zappa in the 1960s.

Career

Seeman was born in New York in 1931, and attended both the High School of Music & Art and the Pratt Institute. He began his animation career at Paramount Pictures, making animation cels for shows such as Popeye the Sailorman and Casper the Friendly Ghost. He won several awards for his work, including Clios and ADDYs.

Seeman's career was interrupted when he was drafted into the U.S. Army. He served in Frankfurt with the 4th Infantry Division from 1952 to 1954. Seeman produced cartoons for Army's internal information program.

After returning from military service, Seeman and his partner Ray Favata began the media company Gryphon Productions, which ran from about 1960 to 1969. They produced commercials using cartoon characters, including the Trix rabbit, Sugar Bear and My Little Pony.

Seeman worked closely with Frank Zappa, producing films for Zappa such as the 14-hour montage Uncle Meat, for which he won a Cine Golden Eagle Award. In 1981 Seeman and Favata won an Emmy Award for their work on the intro to the children's television show The Great Space Coaster.

Seeman also produced and directed a number of pornographic films, such as The Healers, Fongaluli, and Madame Zenobia, which were marketed outside the US.

Films

Film festival
 Frekoba, 1968, dancer Frances Alenikoff
 Dana and Clay, 1969, dancers Dana Wolfe and Clay Taliaferro
 High Contrast, 1969
 Space Oddities, 1970
 Incubus c. 1971, dancer Frances Alenikoff

Frank Zappa
 Electric Circus, c. 1967
 Rehearsal, c. 1967
 Sex, Paint and Sound, c. 1967
 Mothers of Invention,1968
Also known as: 
 Uncle Meat (40-minute version)
 Frank Zappa and the Original Mothers of Invention,video cassette version of film, 1987
 The Real Uncle Meat
 Raw Meat
 Suzy Creamcheese What's Got Into You?
Seeman contributed motion picture photography for Frank Zappa's:
 The Burnt Weeny Sandwich (unpublished)
 Uncle Meat 14 hrs version (the footage of the Mothers of Invention) (parts of it were shown publicly, but the whole was unpublished)

As Eduardo Cemano, sex industry films
 Millie's Homecoming, 1971
 The Weirdos and the Oddballs (aka Zora Knows Best), 1971
 The Healers, 1972
 Fongaluli, 1972, also named Aphrodisiac and The Love Potion
 Madame Zenobia, 1973

Eduardo Cemano short films
 Blushing Nude
 Cucumber
 Floating Nudes

Gallery

References

People from the Bronx
Artists from the Bronx
People from Ocala, Florida
American animators
American animated film directors
American television directors
American animated film producers
American erotic photographers
American erotic artists
American abstract artists
1931 births
Living people
American comic strip cartoonists
American comics artists
American illustrators
United States Army soldiers
American pornographic film directors
American pornographic film producers
American cinematographers
Photographers from the Bronx
Frank Zappa
Television producers from Florida